Darcy John Nicholas  (born 1945) is a New Zealand artist, writer and art administrator.

Art administration career
Nicholas opened his own art gallery in Lower Hutt in 1975. In 1981 he became director of the Wellington Arts Centre.

In 1986 Nicholas was appointed director of the Central Regional Arts Council and in 1989 was appointed Assistant General Manager with the Iwi Transition Agency.

Nicholas led the development of the Pataka Art + Museum complex in Porirua, which opened in 1998. He stepped down from his role as Pataka's director and Porirua City Council's community services general manager in 2012.

Nicholas also established the Māori Art Market art fair in 2005 and has remained involved in the creative leadership of the event.

Artistic practice
Nicholas has been involved in the contemporary Māori art movement since the late 1960s. Nicholas spent 10 years with the New Zealand Police early in his career, but painted and exhibited during this time. In 1973 he decided to move into making art full-time. He has exhibited throughout New Zealand, Australia, Africa, United States, France, India, Britain, Germany, Netherlands, and Canada.

Nicholas was commissioned to produce a sculpture for the opening of Pukeahu National War Memorial Park in 2015.

Awards and recognitions
1984 Fulbright Scholarship to observe contemporary Native American and African America art in the United States
Queens Service Order for services to museums in the 2010 Queen's Birthday Honours
2013 Supreme Te Waka Toi award, Creative New Zealand

Personal life
Nicholas was born in Waitara in 1945. He lives in Stokes Valley, Lower Hutt. Nicholas is of Māori (Te Āti Awa, Ngāi Te Rangi, Taranaki, Ngāti Ruanui, Ngāti Hauā) and European descent.

Further reading
'Land of My Ancestors – Darcy Nicholas Artist', documentary film, 2007, nzonscreen.com
 Darcy Nicholas' website

References

Living people
1945 births
Te Āti Awa people
Ngāti Ruanui people
New Zealand police officers
New Zealand Māori artists
Companions of the Queen's Service Order
Ngāi Te Rangi people
Taranaki (iwi)
People from Waitara, New Zealand
20th-century New Zealand sculptors
20th-century New Zealand male artists
21st-century New Zealand sculptors
People educated at Waitara High School
Fulbright alumni